Alfoz de Santa Gadea is a municipality located in the province of Burgos, Castile and León, Spain. According to the 2004 census (INE), the municipality has a population of 132 inhabitants.

The Alfoz de Santa Gadea is made up of three towns: Santa Gadea (seat or capital), Quintanilla de Santa Gadea and Higón.

References 

Municipalities in the Province of Burgos